Xylocalyx is a genus of plants in the family Orobanchaceae.

Species
Species include:
 Xylocalyx aculeolatus S.Carter
 Xylocalyx asper Balf.f.
 Xylocalyx carterae Thulin
 Xylocalyx hispidus S.Carter
 Xylocalyx recurvus S.Carter

References

 
Orobanchaceae genera
Taxonomy articles created by Polbot
Taxa named by Isaac Bayley Balfour